The National Championship II (also DHL Nemzeti Bajnokság II for sponsorship reasons) is the third and lowest level of domestic club rugby union in Hungary after the Extraliga and the National Championship I. The competition was introduced in 1989. It has undergone a major overhaul for the 2011-12 season, changing into a championship for some of the newer teams where promotion is unlikely.

Format and structure
For the 2011-12 season, the league is played by five teams who play in a number of centralized tournaments (tournaments held in one location). Matches consist of two halves of twenty minutes.

Current teams
2011–12 season

 Gyulai Várvédők RK were originally slated to play in this tournament as well, but they seem to have withdrawn altogether, due to lack of playing numbers.

Champions
 1990 Battai Bulldogok
 1991
 1992 Battai Bulldogok
 1993 Budapest Exiles
 1994 Esztergomi Vitézek
 1995
 1996
 1997 Szentes
 1998
 1999
 2000 Szentes
 2001 Esztergomi Vitézek II
 2002 Esztergomi Vitézek II
 2003 Esztergomi Vitézek II
 2004 Pécsi Indiánok
 2005 Szentes
 2006 Szentes
 2007
 2008
 2009
 2010 Szentes

Notes and references

See also
Rugby union in Hungary

Rugby union leagues in Europe
Rugby union leagues in Hungary
1989 establishments in Hungary
Sports leagues established in 1889